Alexander McMillan (died 1817) was a Congressional Representative from North Carolina.

McMillan was a member of the North Carolina Senate, 1810–1812; he was elected to the Fifteenth United States Congress but died before ever serving.

See also 
Fifteenth United States Congress

External links
Entry in US Congress Biographical Directory

18th-century births
North Carolina state senators
Year of birth unknown
1817 deaths
Federalist Party members of the United States House of Representatives from North Carolina